Great Chalfield Manor is an English country house at Great Chalfield, about  northeast of the town of Bradford on Avon in the west of the county of Wiltshire.

History 
Pevsner describes Great Chalfield as "one of the most perfect examples of the late medieval English manor house".

The moated manor house was built around 1465–1480 for Thomas Tropenell, a modest member of the landed gentry who made a fortune as a clothier. It is on the site of an earlier fortified house, of which traces remain: the bases of curtain walls to the east and north, and parts of two towers.

The independent hall, lit on both sides, is flanked by unusually symmetrical gabled cross wings, with oriel windows and lower gabled porches in the inner corners, in the north-facing former entrance court, for which the richest effects were reserved. Its external symmetry, unusual for its date, is superficial. The intimately connected parish church, largely rebuilt by Tropenell, also faces into the court, which was formerly entered obliquely through a gatehouse in the west wing; Nicholas Cooper observes of the church that "the probable need to pass through the house's forecourt in order to reach it neatly demonstrates the community of secular and religious authority". Part of a moat survives, but the forecourt has been opened up to the outside in a manner that changes its original inward-facing aspect.

The house passed into the Eyre family by the marriage of Ann Tropenell to John Eyre of Wedhampton in 1550. It passed down in the Eyre family for three generations until 1631 when Sir John Eyre sold it to Sir Richard Gurney, Lord Mayor of London. It afterwards passed via Thomas and William Hanham, John Hall of Bradford and Evelyn Pierrepont, 2nd Duke of Kingston-upon-Hull to Robert Neale.

The house was altered substantially (with some of the original character lost) after the Neale family commissioned the architect Thomas Larkins Walker, a pupil of Pugin, to carry out a detailed survey of the manor in 1836; though his restoration proposals of 1837 were never carried out, the house was reduced and in particular, the great hall, adapted as a farmhouse, lost its ornate ceiling, with only one of the original bosses surviving.

Externally there is a garden with four "tree houses", groups of four clipped yews that have grown together and been hollowed out inside to allow one to walk through.

20th century and today 
The house and garden were purchased by George Fuller MP (of Neston Park) in the early 1900s, and restored and furnished between 1905 and 1911 by his fourth son, Major Robert Fuller, under the guidance of Sir Harold Brakspear.  The restoration included a sympathetic garden design by Alfred Parsons.

Robert Fuller gave the house and nine acres of land to the National Trust in 1943, and it is open to the public.  Robert Floyd, grandson of Robert Fuller, and his family live here and manage the property for the Trust. Tours of the house are at fixed times and visitors are escorted by a guide.

The house is Grade I listed; the Tropenell Cartulary manuscript, compiled for Thomas Tropenell, is still kept there. The barn northwest of the house, built in the 17th and 18th centuries, is also Grade I listed, while the gardens are Grade II listed.

Church 

All Saints' Church, near the front of the house, is a small church dating from the 14th century.  It is Great Chalfield's parish church, although the civil parish was amalgamated into the newly created parish of Atworth in 1884.

A chapel at Great Chalfield was first mentioned in 1316; in 1428 it was a church with fewer than ten parishioners. The present church was built c. 1480 by Thomas Tropenell and the surviving features from that time include the south chapel, the small square bellcote and the roof of the nave. Robert Neale carried out improvements in 1775 which included the addition of a family chapel, now used as a vestry, to the east of the south chapel. Several windows are from the 19th century and further restoration was undertaken in 1914. The font is 13th century and the pulpit 17th.

Church registers survive from 1605. The building was designated as Grade I listed in 1962. Today the church is part of the benefice of Broughton Gifford, Great Chalfield & Holt.

Film location 
The house and grounds have been used for location filming since the end of the 20th century.

They were used for Wives and Daughters in 1999, the BBC Television adaptation of Elizabeth Gaskell's novel, as Hamley Hall, the country house of a squire. They were later used for the 2008 film version of the historical novel The Other Boleyn Girl, and some scenes of the 2008 BBC Television adaptation of Tess of the d'Urbervilles. Scenes for the BBC's Tudor-era historical TV serial Wolf Hall were filmed there in 2014. The house is also used as the filming location for Killewarran House in the BBC series of Poldark.

References

External links

Great Chalfield Manor and Garden at the National Trust
Great Chalfield Manor – Patsy & Robert Floyd
Heritage Register of Parks and Gardens of Special Historic Interest: Great Chalfield Manor
  Description of manor, church and landscape.

Gardens in Wiltshire
Country houses in Wiltshire
National Trust properties in Wiltshire
Grade I listed buildings in Wiltshire
Historic house museums in Wiltshire
Grade I listed houses